Homoseh quahote (meaning "orator of the stars" in Mohave) also called Seck-a-hoot, Sicihoot or Sickahoot in some English language sources;  – ) was a hereditary leader of the Mohave.

Life

Homoseh quahote was a member of the Malika clan of Mohave and designated as Aha macave pipataho, which tribal elder Gwegwi nuor of the Oach clan translated as the leader "looked up to by the people because of the kind of person he was". In 1966, Gwegwi nuor provided the only known description of him:

In 1861, Homoseh quahote abdicated the position as leader of the Mohave to Irataba, who served in that capacity until at least 1866 or 1867, though opinions differ. By 1870, Seck-a-hoot had regained his position. The exact year of his death is unknown, but the last official correspondence from the Fort Mohave Indian Reservation that mention him are dated to 1872. He was succeeded as leader of the Mohave by his son, Empote quotacheech.

In 1867, Homoseh quahote was reported to have been part of a group that killed an entire party of 21 Hualapais after they had murdered a group of six American miners in the Fort Mohave area.

References

Bibliography

External links
 Pipa Aha Macav – "The People by the River": The Official Website of the Fort Mojave Indian Tribe
 InterTribal Council of Arizona – Colorado River Indian Tribes

Arizona Territory
Mohave people
Native American leaders
People of the American Old West
1800s births
1870s deaths